The 2006 Italian Athletics Championships was the 96th edition of the Italian Athletics Championships and were held in Turin.

Men

Women

References

External links 
Full results at FIDAL

Italian Athletics Championships
Athletics
Italian Athletics Outdoor Championships
Athletics competitions in Italy
Sports competitions in Turin
2000s in Turin